Phillip Dale Lindsey (born January 18, 1943) is an American football coach and former player.  He is the head football coach at the University of San Diego.  Lindsey has also worked as a coach in the National Football League (NFL), the Canadian Football League (CFL), and the United States Football League (USFL).

Early life
Lindsey attended and played high school football at Bowling Green High School in Bowling Green, Kentucky, where he was an All-State player.

College career
After high school, Lindsey signed with the University of Kentucky, where he was part of the infamous Thin Thirty team, but quit the team in the spring of his freshman year.  He then transferred to Western Kentucky University, where he starred on the Hilltoppers's undefeated 1963 team that won the Tangerine Bowl.

Professional career

As a player
Lindsey was drafted in the seventh round of the 1965 NFL Draft by the Cleveland Browns, where he played from 1965 to 1972.  He then signed with the New Orleans Saints in 1973.

As a coach
After his playing career, Lindsey was a coach for several different NFL teams, including the Green Bay Packers, New England Patriots, Tampa Bay Buccaneers, San Diego Chargers, Washington Redskins, Chicago Bears and the San Diego Chargers.  He was also a coach for the Toronto Argonauts of the Canadian Football League and the Boston Breakers and the New Jersey Generals of the United States Football League.

In 1988, Lindsey joined Forrest Gregg at SMU. As the defensive coordinator, he helped to revitalize the historic SMU football program after the NCAA executed its one and only death penalty for a college football program. During the 1989 season, SMU's first season back after 1987, Lindsey's defense was instrumental in SMU's wins over UConn and North Texas.

He was terminated as the linebackers coach for the Washington Redskins on January 16, 2007. This was his second stint with Washington. He was one of several former NFL coordinators serving as a position coach on the Redskins' coach staff.

Lindsey, now a resident of San Diego, lost his home in the wildfires of October 2007.

Head coaching record

College

Notes

Dale Lindsey did not ‘quit’ University of Kentucky football but ‘pulled-out’ of Coach Charlie Bradshaw’s corrupt program that NCAA penalized for a better football opportunity.

References

External links
 San Diego profile
 

1943 births
Living people
American football linebackers
Chicago Bears coaches
Cleveland Browns players
Green Bay Packers coaches
Kentucky Wildcats football players
Portland Thunder (WFL) coaches
National Football League defensive coordinators
New England Patriots coaches
New Mexico State Aggies football coaches
New Orleans Saints players
San Diego Chargers coaches
San Diego Toreros football coaches
Tampa Bay Buccaneers coaches
Toronto Argonauts coaches
Washington Redskins coaches
Western Kentucky Hilltoppers football players
United States Football League coaches
High school football coaches in Kentucky
People from Bedford, Indiana
Sportspeople from Bowling Green, Kentucky
Coaches of American football from Kentucky
Players of American football from Kentucky